Pleasure Valley is an unincorporated community in Noble Township, Shelby County, in the U.S. state of Indiana.

Located on the north bank of Flatrock River, many of the original summer cottages  have been converted to year-round residences.

References

Unincorporated communities in Shelby County, Indiana
Unincorporated communities in Indiana
Indianapolis metropolitan area